Hernando Barragán (born 1974) is a Colombian interdisciplinary artist, designer, and academic known for creating the Wiring development platform as his 2003 Master’s thesis project at the Interaction Design Institute Ivrea (IDII) in Italy. The Arduino project is based on Wiring.He is currently being an educator in university of Andes.

Career 
Barragán graduated from Computer Science at the Universidad de los Andes in Bogotá, Colombia. He then studied Interaction Design at the IDII in Ivrea, Italy where he developed Wiring, an open-source electronics prototyping platform as his master's thesis which earned him a Master's of Art with distinction degree. His thesis advisors were Casey Reas and Massimo Banzi. Banzi eventually co-created the Arduino electronics prototyping platform and based its programming language on the Wiring programming language. Wiring itself builds on the Processing language developed by Casey Reas and Ben Fry at the MIT Media Lab. Wiring has inspired other electronics prototyping platforms such as Energia. In 2013  Ed Baafi, founder of Modkit declared Wiring “the future of microcontroller programming” during the Sketching in Hardware 2013 conference in PARC in Palo Alto, California. In May 19, 2017 Barragán was named Arduino Chief Design Architect.

Barragán was part of the “Easy as a kiss: Humanizing technology though design Vision, story and impact of Interaction Design Institute Ivrea” exhibition curated by Gillian Crampton-Smith in the Circolo del Design in Turin, Italy from May 7 to September 19, 2021.

As of 2021 he is a tenured professor and the dean of the School of Architecture and Design at the Universidad de los Andes.

References

External links 

 Personal Website
 Professor page at Universidad de los Andes
  The Untold History of Arduino
Hernando Barragán at The Index Project

Colombian designers
1974 births
Living people
Colombian inventors
University of Los Andes (Colombia) alumni
Academic staff of the University of Los Andes (Colombia)